The Rhode Island Storm were a professional ice hockey team in the North East Professional Hockey League that played in the 2009–10 season. They played their home games at the Bradford R. Boss Ice Arena on the Kingston campus of the University of Rhode Island.

Season-by-season record

References

External links
Rhode Island Storm website
North East Professional Hockey League website
Boss Ice Arena website

Ice hockey teams in Rhode Island
North East Professional Hockey League
2009 establishments in Rhode Island
Ice hockey clubs established in 2009
2010 disestablishments in Rhode Island
Sports clubs disestablished in 2010